Donald Ross Cherry (January 11, 1924 – April 4, 2018) was an American traditional pop music and big band singer and golfer. In music, he is best known for his 1955 hit "Band of Gold".

Biography
Cherry was born in Wichita Falls, Texas. He started in his early 20s as a big band singer in the orchestras of Jan Garber and Victor Young. During World War II, he served in the U.S. Army Air Forces. In 1951, he recorded his first solo hits, "Thinking of You" and "Belle, Belle, My Liberty Belle". In 1955, came his biggest hit, "Band of Gold", which reached No. 4 on the Billboard chart. It sold over one million copies, and was awarded a gold disc. The track peaked at No. 6 in the UK Singles Chart. He had three more hits in 1956: "Wild Cherry", "Ghost Town", and "Namely You", all backed by orchestra leader Ray Conniff. He was also the voice of the Mr. Clean commercials during the late 1950s and early 1960s.  In 1962, he also recorded the original version of "Then You Can Tell Me Goodbye", which became a hit much later for The Casinos and others.

Throughout his singing career, Cherry was also a top-ranked amateur golfer, and was in contention to win the 1960 U.S. Open before eventually finishing tied for ninth along with Ben Hogan, four strokes behind winner Arnold Palmer. Cherry played on three Walker Cup teams (1953, 1955, and 1961), in the Americas Cup twice (1954 and 1960) and in nine Masters Tournaments, making the cut seven times with a best finish of T-25 in 1959. He captured the Canadian Amateur Championship in 1953 and the prestigious Sunnehanna Amateur title in 1954. In 1962, Cherry decided to turn professional and "Pro" became his nickname among fellow entertainers. His volcanic temper on the golf course (which, according to Cherry, "...made Tommy Bolt look like a choir boy!") was in startling contrast to his velvety-smooth singing voice and pleasant stage persona. 

Cherry published his biography, Cherry's Jubilee, with co-writer Neil Daniels. He was a good friend of Willie Nelson, and had collaborated on three albums with him, Augusta (1995), The Eyes of Texas (2002), and It's Magic (2007).
Cherry was married four times, once to 1956 Miss America Sharon Ritchie, before wedding Francine Bond Smith, in 1993. They lived in Las Vegas, Nevada. His son, Stephen, was a casualty of the 9/11 attacks when American Airlines Flight 11 crashed into the North Tower. Stephen left behind four sons.

Cherry died at a hospice on April 4, 2018 at the age of 94. He is survived by his wife, Francine.

Singles

 A"Band of Gold" also peaked at No. 6 in UK Singles Chart.
 B"Married" also peaked at No. 30 in Adult Contemporary singles.
 C"Take a Message to Mary" also peaked at No. 71 in Billboard country chart

References

Sources

External links

1924 births
2018 deaths
American male singers
Traditional pop music singers
Singers from Texas
American male golfers
Golfers from Texas
United States Army Air Forces personnel of World War II
People from Wichita Falls, Texas
Decca Records artists